Caeté River is a river of Pará state in Brazil.

Course

The Caeté River runs north past the town of Bragança, Pará.
North of the town the shores are protected by the  Caeté-Taperaçu Marine Extractive Reserve, created in 2005.

See also
List of rivers of Pará

References

Sources

 A. Gorayeb: Análise integrada da paisagem na bacia hidrográfica do Rio Caeté – Amazônia oriental – Brasil. Doktorarbeit, Universidade Estadual Paulista (UNESP), Instituto de Geociências e Ciências Exatas, Campus de Rio Claro, Rio Claro-São Paulo. 2008. 206 S. 

Rivers of Pará